Falling into You is the fourth English-language and fourteenth studio album by Canadian singer Celine Dion, released on 11 March 1996 by Columbia/Epic Records. The follow-up to her commercially successful album The Colour of My Love (1993) and French-language D'eux (1995), Falling into You showed a further progression of Dion's music. Throughout the project she collaborated with Jim Steinman, who wrote and produced "It's All Coming Back to Me Now", among others. Several songs were produced by David Foster, including Diane Warren's "Because You Loved Me". In total, Dion worked on the album with fourteen producers and a variety of songwriters and musicians.

Falling into You won many awards around the world, including two Grammy awards for Album of the Year and Best Pop Album at the 39th annual ceremony, during which Dion performed live. In April 1997, she also won three World Music Awards for World's Best Selling Artist of the Year, World's Best Selling Pop Artist of the Year and World's Best Selling Canadian Artist of the Year. The album is on Rock and Roll Hall of Fame's Definitive 200 list.

Falling into You became Dion's best-selling album and one of the best-selling albums in history, with sales of more than 32 million copies worldwide, including twelve million copies in the US, over two million in the United Kingdom, and over one million in Germany, France, Canada and Australia. In Europe, it has sold over nine million units. It topped the charts around the world, including number one in the United States, Canada, United Kingdom, France, Australia and many more. It became one of the best-selling albums of 1996 and 1997 in various countries and also one of the top-selling albums of the decade. It was certified Diamond, Multi-Platinum, Platinum and Gold around the world.

Five singles were released from the album in Europe, four in Australia, and three in North America. The major success came with the release of "Because You Loved Me", theme from Up Close & Personal (number one in the United States, Canada and Australia), "It's All Coming Back to Me Now" (number one in Canada, Belgium and number two in the US), and Eric Carmen's "All by Myself" (top ten in various countries, including number four in the US).

Conception and composition
Falling into You presented Dion at the height of her popularity, and showed a further progression of her music. The album combines many elements: ornate orchestral frills and African chanting, and instruments like the violin, Spanish guitar, trombone, the cavaquinho, saxophone and supreme string arrangements, which created a new sound. The singles also encompassed a variety of musical styles. "Falling into You" (originally by Marie-Claire D'Ubaldo) and "River Deep, Mountain High" (Ike & Tina Turner cover) made prominent use of percussion instruments. "It's All Coming Back to Me Now" (originally by Pandora's Box) and "All by Myself" (Eric Carmen cover) kept their soft-rock atmosphere, but were combined with the classical sound of the piano.

The ballad, "Because You Loved Me", written by Diane Warren, served as the theme to the 1996 film Up Close & Personal. The album also includes English adaptations of songs from D'eux: "If That's What It Takes" ("Pour que tu m'aimes encore"), "I Don't Know" ("Je sais pas") and "Fly" ("Vole"). Outside North America, Falling into You also features a cover of Carole King's "(You Make Me Feel Like) A Natural Woman". In Asia, the Japanese hit "To Love You More" was added as well. Additionally, the non-US editions of the album include "Your Light", written and produced by Aldo Nova and the Spanish/Latin America editions feature "Sola Otra Vez", a Spanish-language version of "All by Myself". Dion worked on Falling into You with many producers, mainly with Jim Steinman, David Foster, Ric Wake, Jean-Jacques Goldman and Humberto Gatica.

Critical reception

Falling into You divided music critics. Billboard editor Paul Verna gave it a positive review. He called it a deep album that will solidify Dion's reputation as one of the world's true pop divas. Verna highlighted the chart-topping "Because You Loved Me" and other hit-worthy moments on the album: a Meat Loaf-style epic "It's All Coming Back to Me Now", the laid back "Falling into You", bouncy pop "Make You Happy", sultry ballad "Seduces Me" (produced by Duran Duran producer, John Jones), and effervescent "Declaration of Love". Another critic from Billboard spoke positively about "Because You Loved Me" and "It's All Coming Back to Me Now", writing that "Because You Loved Me" is "rife with grand romance, larger-than-life production, and a climax that is best described as the musical equivalent to 4th of July fireworks". The same critic called "It's All Coming Back to Me Now" a ballad that pits Dion against the bombastic production of Jim Steinman, adding that "lesser talents might have been gobbled up by this melodramatic arrangements, but Dion rises to the occasion with a performance that soars above the instrumentation with deliciously theatrical flair".

A positive review also came from senior editor of AllMusic, Stephen Thomas Erlewine, who gave Falling into You four stars out of five. Although he noted that the album is formulaic, Erlewine appreciated its well-executed, stylish, and catchy formula, accentuating Dion's natural vocal charm. He praised ballads like "Because You Loved Me" and mock epics like "It's All Coming Back to Me Now". He felt that Dion tackles dance-pop and love songs with grace and that effortless elegance saves the mediocre material on the album from being tedious. According to him, there are a couple of weak tracks on Falling into You but it is a remarkably well-crafted set of adult contemporary pop and Dion's best album. Chuck Eddy from Entertainment Weekly gave it a B in his review. Eddy wrote: "There's something compellingly eccentric about even the mushiest ballads on Celine Dion's new set Falling into You, which features Spanish guitars, African chanting, and ornate orchestral frills. But only in her desolate cover of Eric Carmen's "All by Myself" and her brutal blues-mama dance "Declaration of Love" (which kicks like Bonnie Raitt and Wynonna only wish they could) does she truly crash through the glass ceiling of passion".

Mixed or negative reviews came from Elysa Gardner of the Los Angeles Times, Stephen Holden of The New York Times and Dan Leroy of Yahoo! Music. Gardner gave the album two out of four stars and wrote that Dion "dabbles in more soulful and sophisticated textures, and at times her dilettantism pays off. But she often falls back on her characteristic platform of polite, predictable schmaltz". Holden wrote that the album is "crammed with formulaic romantic bombast. The melodrama peaks with two overblown Jim Steinman productions: "It's All Coming Back to Me Now", a romantic flashback replete with thunderclaps, and "River Deep, Mountain High", an anemic remake of a classic Phil Spector production". However, he praised "Because You Loved Me" (calling it this year's "Wind Beneath My Wings") and a remake of Carmen's 1976 hit, "All by Myself". Leroy said that "trying to out-emote Eric Carmen was almost crazy enough to work, and working with over-the-top Meat Loaf collaborator Jim Steinman seemed a sensible choice. But the results weren't much different than usual". The Rolling Stone Album Guide gave the album one and a half stars out of five.

24/7 Wall St. ranked the album at #88 on their list of 100 Best Pop Albums of all time saying that this album proved that pop isn't just for teenagers.

Cultural impact
Elle Canada discussed how Falling into You changed pop music forever saying: "the album helped shape genre trends of the era and cemented the enduring relevance of the heartfelt power ballad in a cynical musical landscape that still sneered at sentimentality. Dion, especially with Falling into You, helped usher power ballads into the '90s. And her influence set the stage for the next generation of big vocalists such as Adele, Jennifer Hudson, Lady Gaga, and Ariana Grande".

Reader's Digest Canada included Falling into You as one of the 25 Greatest Canadian Albums of all time, placing it at number 22, calling it the "most complete summation of her gifts as an entertainer: stylish, catchy and unabashedly emotional".

In 2014, Richard Dunn recorded a video on his iPhone when he was trapped alone in the Las Vegas airport overnight which utilized one of the biggest songs from the album, the 1996 cover of Eric Carmen's "All by Myself" that immediately became a viral hit across the internet.

Shock listed Céline Dion as one of the most memorable music acts in the history of Olympic games. USA Today also listed The Power of the Dream at the Atlanta Olympic Games as the second best Olympic themesong ever. On 19 July 1996, for a TV audience of 3.5 billion viewers, Celine Dion sang "The Power of the Dream" during the Opening Ceremonies of the Atlanta Olympic Games. It was the ultimate triumph that made her arguably the most famous singer on the planet at that time.

In early 2022, the classic hit "Its All Coming Back To Me Now" saw a resurgence on TikTok. Superstars like Michael Buble, Mandy Moore, Amanda Holden, Jordin Sparks and Viola Davis among many others jumped on the trend.

Commercial performance
Falling into You remains one of the best-selling albums of all time, with sales of more than 32 million copies worldwide, and became the best-selling album of 1996 globally.

Canada
In Canada, Falling into You became Dion's second number-one album, after The Colour of My Love. It was certified Diamond in November 1996 and has sold 1.6 million copies. Falling into You was her second album awarded Diamond in Canada, after The Colour of My Love. Dion's 1992 eponymous album was also certified Diamond but in 1998. Falling into You also topped the Quebec chart for fourteen weeks.

United States
In the United States, Falling into You debuted at number two in March 1996, selling 193,000 copies. It reached number one on the Billboard 200 on the issue date 5 October 1996, in its twenty-eighth week, selling 132,000 copies. It stayed at number one for the next week, selling 130,500 copies. After falling to the third place a week later, the album returned to the number one spot on 26 October 1996, selling 136,000 copies, spending three non-consecutive weeks at number one on the chart. The best sales week for the album was on 4 January 1997 issue date with 370,000 copies sold, being the second best selling album of the week. With Falling into You, Dion scored her first number-one album on the Billboard 200. It spent 61 weeks inside the top ten of the chart. Falling into You was the second best-selling album of 1996, with six million copies sold, the eighth best seller of 1997, with three million sold and the fifth best-selling album on the 1990s decade in the US with 10,224,282 copies sold. As of November 2019, Falling into You has sold 10,900,000 copies in the United States according to Nielsen SoundScan, with an additional 987,000 units sold at BMG Music Club. SoundScan does not count albums sold through clubs like the BMG Music Service, which were significantly popular in the 1990s. It was certified Diamond by the RIAA in December 1997 and twelve-times Platinum in 2021, for shipments of over twelve million copies in the US.

UK, France and Germany
In the United Kingdom, the album debuted at number one and became Dion's second chart topper, after The Colour of My Love. In January 1998, it was certified seven-times Platinum by the BPI for sales of 2.1 million copies. In France, Falling into You topped the chart for five non-consecutive weeks and became Dion's second number one, after D'eux. It was certified Diamond by the SNEP and has sold 1.2 million units there. In Germany, the album peaked at number five and was certified five-times Gold by the BVMI for sales of 1.3 million copies. Falling into You was also awarded by the IFPI with nine-times Platinum Europe Award for sales of over nine million copies in Europe.

Australia and rest of the world
In Australia, it debuted at number one and spent four non-consecutive weeks at the top. It became Dion's second number-one album there, after The Colour of My Love. Falling into You was certified thirteen-times Platinum by the ARIA and has sold one million copies in Australia. It also topped the charts in many other countries and was certified Diamond, Multi-Platinum, Platinum and Gold around the world. Additionally, Falling into You was the overall best seller at Hong-Kong's HMV stores. Falling into You has also sold over 17 million copies worldwide between March 1996 to December 1996 (9 months span).

Singles
Two songs were released in February 1996 to promote the album: "Falling into You" in Europe and Australia, and "Because You Loved Me" in North America, South America and Asia. In May 1996, "Because You Loved Me" was issued as the second single in Europe and Australia. "Falling into You" reached number one in Spain, number eight in Norway and number ten in the United Kingdom, and entered top forty on the charts in other countries. Much bigger success came with "Because You Loved Me", which peaked at number one in the United States, Canada and Australia. The song also reached top ten in many countries around the world, including number five in the UK. It was certified two-times Platinum in Australia, Platinum in the US and New Zealand, and Gold in the UK and Germany.

"It's All Coming Back to Me Now" was released as the second single in North America in July 1996. It topped the chart in Canada and peaked at number two in the US. In September 1996, "It's All Coming Back to Me Now" was issued as the third single in most European countries and in Australia. In France and Germany, it was released as the fourth single in early 1997. "It's All Coming Back to Me Now" reached number one in Belgium and peaked inside top ten in various countries, including number three in the UK. It was certified Platinum in the US and Gold in the UK, Australia and New Zealand.

"All by Myself" was issued as the third single in France and Germany in October 1996. In other European countries it was released as the fourth single in December 1996, after "It's All Coming Back to Me Now". "All by Myself" was also issued as the fourth single in Australia in February 1997 and third in North America in March 1997. It reached number four in the US and peaked inside top ten in several other countries, including number six in the UK. "All by Myself" was certified Gold in the US, and Silver in the UK and France. The fifth European single, "Call the Man" was released in June 1997 and reached number eight in Ireland and number eleven in the UK. It was a minor hit in few other countries.

The Asian editions of Falling into You included "To Love You More", a 1995 hit single which reached number one in Japan and has sold 1.3 million copies there. The editions of Falling into You released outside North America featured "(You Make Me Feel Like) A Natural Woman", which was released in few countries as a promotional single from Tapestry Revisited: A Tribute to Carole King in November 1995. The Australian and Asian limited editions of Falling into You with bonus disc included "The Power of the Dream", a song performed by Dion during the 1996 Summer Olympics opening ceremony. "The Power of the Dream" was released as a single in Japan in August 1996. It reached number thirty there and was certified Gold. Additionally, three more promotional singles from Falling into You were released: "Dreamin' of You" in Mexico, "Make You Happy" in Brazil and "River Deep – Mountain High" in France.

Promotion
Dion promoted her new album with the Falling Into You Around the World Tour. It started in Perth, Australia on 18 March 1996 and ended on 26 June 1997 in Zürich, Switzerland. Dion toured Australia in March 1996, Canada in May and June 1996, the United States between July and August 1996, Europe between September and November 1996, and Canada again in December 1996. In February 1997 she toured Asia, in March and April 1997 the US, in May 1997 Canada and in June 1997 Europe again. One of the concerts was recorded and released in selected countries on VHS. It was titled Live in Memphis.

Dion also promoted Falling into You on various television shows. In the US, she performed "Because You Loved Me" on The Tonight Show with Jay Leno, Blockbuster Entertainment Awards and Live with Regis and Kathie Lee in March 1996. Dion also sang it on the Late Show with David Letterman in April 1996 and Good Morning America and The Oprah Winfrey Show in May 1996. She performed her next US single, "It's All Coming Back to Me Now" on The Tonight Show with Jay Leno in July 1996 and The Rosie O'Donnell Show in September 1996. On 19 July 1996, Dion sang "The Power of the Dream" at the opening ceremony of the 1996 Summer Olympics in Atlanta, United States.

In December 1996, she performed her third US single, "All by Myself" at the Billboard Music Awards and on The Tonight Show with Jay Leno. Dion also sang it at the 39th Annual Grammy Awards on 26 February 1997. Additionally, she performed "Seduces Me" on The Rosie O'Donnell Show in January 1997 and "(You Make Me Feel Like) A Natural Woman" on the Late Show with David Letterman the next month. In March 1997, Dion sang "Because You Loved Me" and "Fly" on The Oprah Winfrey Show. She also performed "Because You Loved Me" and "I Finally Found Someone" at the 69th Academy Awards on 24 March 1997.

The promotion in other countries included performance of "Falling into You" at the Sanremo Music Festival in Italy in March 1996, and "Because You Loved Me" on two Dutch television shows, Vijf TV Show and Tros in April 1996. The next month, Dion performed "Because You Loved Me" at the World Music Awards in Monte Carlo, Monaco and on the German television show Verstehen Sie Spaß?, and "Falling into You" on the French television show Dimanche Martin.

In November 1996, she sang "All by Myself" at the Bambi Awards in Germany. Dion also performed "All by Myself" and "River Deep, Mountain High" on Taratata in France the same month. In December 1996 she sang "All by Myself" on the French television show Les Années Tubes. In March 1997, Dion performed "To Love You More" with Taro Hakase on violin at the Juno Awards. In April 1997, she sang "To Love You More" with Taro Hakase again on the Japanese television show, Music Fair and "Call the Man" at the World Music Awards in Monte Carlo, Monaco.

Industry awards

At the 39th Annual Grammy Awards, Falling into You won Grammy Award for Album of the Year and Best Pop Album. "Because You Loved Me" was nominated for Grammy Award for Record of the Year, Best Female Pop Vocal Performance, Song of the Year and won Grammy Award for Best Song Written Specifically for a Motion Picture or Television. Thanks to Falling into You, Dion won three World Music Awards in 1997 for World's Best Selling Artist of the Year, World's Best Selling Pop Artist of the Year and World's Best Selling Canadian Artist of the Year. She was also nominated for American Music Awards for Favorite Pop/Rock Female Artist and Favorite Adult Contemporary Artist in both 1997 and 1998, and won American Music Award for Favorite Pop/Rock Female Artist in January 1998. At the Juno Awards of 1997, Dion won Juno Award for Female Vocalist of the Year and International Achievement Award. Falling into You won Juno Award for Best Selling Album (Foreign or Domestic) and was nominated for Album of the Year. "Because You Loved Me" was nominated for the Juno Award for Single of the Year.

Other awards won by Dion and Falling into You include: IRMA Award for Best International Female Artist Album, Bambi Award for Top International Pop Star of the Year, Amigo Award for Best International Female Artist, VH1 Award for Artist of the Year, NARM Best Seller Awards for Artist of the Year, Recording of the Year, Pop Recording of the Year and Alternative Recording of the Year. Félix Awards for Artist of the Year Achieving the Most Success Outside Quebec and Artist of the Year Achieving the Most Success in a Language Other Than French in 1996 and again in 1997, Pop Corn Music Awards for Best Female Singer of the Year and Best Album of the Year, Malta Music Award for Best Selling International Artist, National TV 2 Award for Best International Female Artist, South African Music Award for Best Selling International Album, Coca-Cola Full Blast Music Award for Most Popular International Artist, FM Select Diamond Award for Top Female International Artist and International Achievement in Arts Award for Entertainer of the Year for Distinguished Achievement in Music. "To Love You More" added to the Asian editions of Falling into You won International Single Grand Prix at the Japan Gold Disc Awards in 1996.

Dion was also nominated for many Billboard Music Awards in 1996 and 1997, including Top Pop Artist, Top Billboard 200 Album Artist, Hot 100 Singles Artist, Hot Adult Contemporary Artist and Hot Adult Top 40 Artist. "Because You Loved Me" was nominated in the categories Hot 100 Singles, Hot 100 Singles Airplay, Hot Adult Contemporary Singles & Tracks and Hot Adult Top 40 Singles & Tracks, and Falling into You was nominated for Top Billboard 200 Album. She was nominated for Blockbuster Entertainment Awards in categories Favorite Female Artist - Pop and Favourite Song from a Movie ("Because You Loved Me"). At the 1997 BRIT Awards, Dion was nominated for Best International Female. She was nominated twice for Echo Awards for International Female Artist of the Year and Danish Music Awards for Best International Female Singer. Dion was also nominated for MuchMusic Video Award for Peoples Choice: Favourite International Artist.

Additionally, "Because You Loved Me" was nominated for Academy Award for Best Original Song and Golden Globe Award for Best Original Song. It also won an ASCAP Film and Television Music Award for Most Performed Song from Motion Picture and ASCAP Pop Awards for Most Performed Song in 1997, 1998 and 1999. "It's All Coming Back to Me Now" won a BMI Pop Award for Song of the Year. Both "It's All Coming Back to Me Now" and "All by Myself" won BMI Pop Awards for Most Performed Songs. "The Power of the Dream", included on 2CD limited editions of Falling into You, won a BMI Film & TV Award in the category Special Recognition: The Olympic Tribute Award and was nominated for Emmy Award for Outstanding Music and Lyrics.

Track listing
The album contains 14 tracks on the US edition, 15 in Canada and 16 in other countries. Songs added outside the US include: "Your Light", "(You Make Me Feel Like) A Natural Woman", "To Love You More" and "Sola Otra Vez".

Notes
  signifies a co-producer
  signifies additional production and remix
  signifies an additional producer

Charts

Weekly charts

Year-end charts

Decade-end charts

All-time charts

Certifications and sales

Release history

See also

Best-selling albums in the United States since Nielsen SoundScan tracking began
Grammy Award for Album of the Year
Grammy Award for Best Pop Vocal Album
Juno Award for International Album of the Year
List of best-selling albums
List of best-selling albums by women
List of best-selling albums in Australia
List of best-selling albums in Europe
List of best-selling albums in France
List of best-selling albums in Germany
List of best-selling albums in New Zealand
List of best-selling albums in the United States
List of best-selling albums of the 1990s in the United Kingdom
List of Billboard 200 number-one albums of 1996
List of diamond-certified albums in Canada
List of European number-one hits of 1996
List of number-one albums from the 1990s (New Zealand)
List of number-one albums in Australia during the 1990s
List of number-one albums of 1996 (Canada)
List of Top 25 albums for 1996 in Australia
List of Top 25 albums for 1997 in Australia
List of UK Albums Chart number ones of the 1990s

References

External links
 

1996 albums
550 Music albums
Celine Dion albums
Albums produced by Aldo Nova
Albums produced by David Foster
Albums produced by Humberto Gatica
Albums produced by Jim Steinman
Albums produced by John Jones (record producer)
Albums produced by Rick Nowels
Albums produced by Ric Wake
Albums produced by Roy Bittan
Albums produced by Steven Rinkoff
Grammy Award for Album of the Year
Grammy Award for Best Pop Vocal Album
Juno Award for International Album of the Year albums